The electoral district of Albert Park is one of the electoral districts of Victoria, Australia, for the Victorian Legislative Assembly. It lies within the Southern Metropolitan Region of the upper house, the Legislative Council.

It was first proclaimed in 1889, and has been held by the Labor Party without interruption since the 1950 election.

John Thwaites was the member from 1992 to 2007, serving as deputy leader of Victorian Labor from 1996 to 2007 and as Deputy Premier of Victoria from 1999 to 2007. He and Premier Steve Bracks, the member for neighbouring Williamstown, both resigned on 30 July 2007.  A by-election was held on 15 September 2007, which resulted in Martin Foley retaining the seat for Labor.

Members for Albert Park

Election results

External links
 Electorate profile: Albert Park District, Victorian Electoral Commission

References

Electoral districts of Victoria (Australia)
1889 establishments in Australia
City of Port Phillip
St Kilda, Victoria
Electoral districts and divisions of Greater Melbourne